RocketCake is a proprietary WYSIWYG editor for building websites using responsive web design. The program creates and publishes websites without any programming. Functionality such as video players, galleries, contact forms, and animated slide shows can be added to websites through the software.

The editor generates W3C standards-compliant HTML, PHP, CSS, and JavaScript. It was built using C++ and the WxWidgets tools library, making it cross platform and working on macOS and Microsoft Windows.

Professional edition
Developer Ambiera provides a professional edition of the otherwise free editor which adds support for custom CSS/ HTML/ PHP/ JavaScript, user-defined breakpoints and premium support.

Reception
A Softpedia review found the software was user-friendly, straightforward and intuitive to use.

References

External links

Web Page Design
Red Deer Web Design
Small Business Web Design

Web design
Responsive web design
Portable software
HTML editors
Automated WYSIWYG editors
Web development software